The 2006 FIA European Touring Car Cup was the second running of the FIA European Touring Car Cup. It was held on 22 October 2006 at the Autódromo Fernanda Pires da Silva near Estoril in Portugal.

Teams and drivers

Final standings

References

External links
Official website of the FIA European Touring Car Cup

European Touring Car Cup
European Touring Car Cup
European Touring Car Cup
2006 in European sport
2006 in Portuguese motorsport